In plant taxonomy, Principes is a botanical name, meaning "the first". It was used in the Engler system for an order in the Monocotyledones and later in the Kubitzki system. This order included one family only, the Palmae (alternate name Arecaceae). As the rules for botanical nomenclature provide for the use of such descriptive botanical names above the rank of family it is quite allowed to use this name even today, but in practice most systems prefer the name Arecales.

Following this, Principes became the name of the journal of the International Palm Society, becoming Palms in 1999.

Historically recognized angiosperm taxa